Cohen Nunatak is a nunatak lying  west of the lower part of Reedy Glacier and  east of the Berry Peaks. It was mapped by the United States Geological Survey from ground surveys and from U.S. Navy air photos, 1960–63, and named by the Advisory Committee on Antarctic Names for Lieutenant Harvey A. Cohen, U.S. Navy Reserve, public affairs officer on the staff of the Commander, U.S. Naval Support Force, Antarctica, in Operation Deep Freeze 1966 and 1967.

References 

Nunataks of Wilkes Land